In the British Army, a gentleman ranker is an enlisted soldier suited through education and social background to be a commissioned officer, or indeed a former commissioned officer. Rudyard Kipling titled one of his poems, published 1892, "Gentlemen-Rankers".

Gentleman rankers in the British Army 
The term "gentleman ranker" suggests that the soldier was born to wealth and privilege but disgraced himself and so has enlisted as a common soldier (or one of the other ranks) serving apart from the society that now scorns him. This fate was similar to that of a remittance man, often the black sheep of a "good" family, paid a regular allowance to stay abroad, far from home, where he cannot embarrass the family.

The gentleman rankers also included the soldiers who signed on specifically as "gentleman volunteers" in the British Army to serve as private soldiers with the understanding being that they would be given a commission (without purchase) at a later date. The men trained and fought as private soldiers but "messed" (dined and perhaps socialized) with the officers and were thus afforded a social standing of somewhere in between the two.

Perhaps the most famous gentleman ranker of the 20th century was T. E. Lawrence. He retired from the British army after World War I with the rank of colonel, but rejoined the military as an enlisted man using an assumed name.

With growing social mobility and the rising standard of education for army entrants, the term is becoming archaic. Soldiers from a titled, landed or privately educated background may still be considered gentleman rankers.

Kipling's poem
The term appears in several of Rudyard Kipling's stories and as the title of a poem he wrote which appeared in Barrack-Room Ballads, and Other Verses, first series, published in 1892. T. S. Eliot included it in his 1941 collection A Choice of Kipling's Verse.

In Kipling's poem "Gentlemen-Rankers", the speaker "sings":

In the poem, "machinely crammed" may indicate the use of a Latin "crammer" and the general method of learning by rote; a somewhat mechanical process. The Empress is Queen Victoria, specifically in her role as Empress of India. Ready tin means easy access to money. Branded with the blasted worsted spur refers to the emblem of a spur, embroidered with worsted wool, that was sewn onto the uniforms of highly skilled riding masters of the British Army. The Curse of Reuben refers to the Biblical story of Reuben, who, for sexual misconduct, was told by his dying father, "Reuben, thou art my first-born .... Unstable as water, thou shall never excel...." (Genesis 49:3-4).

Adaptations of and references to the poem 
Kipling's poem, in translation, was set to music by Edvard Grieg in 1900 (EG 156, Gentlemen-Menige.) However, after he had completed it, he received a copy of the English original and was so dismayed by the omission of important passages that he did not publish it; it was published posthumously in 1991.

The poem was set to music and sung at Harvard and Yale Universities in the early 1900s. It became associated with one collegiate a cappella group in particular, The Whiffenpoofs of Yale. Their historian states that the song was known "as far back as 1902" and was popular by  1907–1909. The words were famously adapted by Meade Minnigerode and George Pomeroy to become "The Whiffenpoof Song". In turn, it has been covered by many singers, including Bing Crosby and Rudy Vallee.

James Jones's award-winning 1951 bestseller From Here to Eternity, about American soldiers in Hawaii on the eve of the U.S. entry into World War II, takes its title from Kipling's poem. In Robert Heinlein's novel Starship Troopers (1959), the poem is sung at marching cadence by Mobile Infantry officer cadets.

Billy Bragg borrows part of this poem in his song "Island Of No Return" on his 1984 album Brewing Up with Billy Bragg: "Me and the corporal out on the spree, Damned from here to Eternity". Peter Bellamy recorded it in 1990 for his privately issued cassette Soldiers Three. This recording was also included in 2012 on the CD reissue of Peter Bellamy Sings the Barrack-Room Ballads of Rudyard Kipling.

The song is spoken of in The Road to Kalamata, a memoir by soldier of fortune Mike Hoare, who led several mercenary companies during the bush wars in the Katanga and former Belgian Congo during the 1960s.

Eliza Carthy recorded the poem in full on her 2019 album “Restitute”. Her version is sung a capella and repeats the "chorus" of Kipling’s poem several times which do not appear in the original text.

References

Further reading
 Gentleman Ranker, John Jennings, Reynal & Hitchcock (1942), .
 The Gentleman Ranker and Other Plays, Leon Gordon, Kessinger Publishing 2007, .

See also  
 Artists Rifles (which included artists and other professionals)
 Temporary gentlemen (officers, particularly wartime, from outside the usual "officer class")

External links
 
 
 Worsted spur

Gentry
Military slang and jargon
Poetry by Rudyard Kipling
Yale University
History of the British Army